Joshua Payne Scobey (born December 11, 1979) is a former American football running back and kick returner who played seven seasons in the National Football League (NFL). He played college football at Kansas State and was drafted by the Arizona Cardinals in the sixth round of the 2002 NFL Draft.

Early years
At Del City High School, Scobey finished with the best single season rushing total in Del City High School history, with 1,829 yards (1997). He rushed for 3,303 total rushing yards, trailing only Bennie Butler (University of Oklahoma) in career rushing yards. He also finished only behind Butler in total rushing and receiving yards with 3,408.

College career
Scobey attended Northeastern Oklahoma A&M College in Miami, Oklahoma.

He then transferred to Kansas State University, where he started at running back and set a school record for rushing touchdowns.

Professional career
Scobey's NFL career began when he was drafted by the Arizona Cardinals in the 2002 NFL Draft. In 2003, Scobey led the National Football League in kick-off return yardage and was allowed to be voted for the Pro Bowl. He played for the Cardinals for three seasons before moving to the Seahawks. In Seattle, he earned an NFC championship ring and he was the Seahawks' kickoff returner in Super Bowl XL against the Pittsburgh Steelers, and served as a team captain for the game and coin toss. 
  
On May 3, 2007, Scobey signed with the Buffalo Bills, but he re-signed with the Seahawks on December 4, exactly one year after he was placed on injured reserve by the Seahawks in 2006.

Personal
Scobey is Buddhist. He practices Nichiren Buddhism through the Soka Gakkai International, and has been a practicing Buddhist since he was five years old.

References

External links

Just Sports Stats
Seattle Seahawks bio
United Football League bio

1979 births
Living people
Sportspeople from Oklahoma City
American football running backs
American football return specialists
Kansas State Wildcats football players
Arizona Cardinals players
Seattle Seahawks players
Buffalo Bills players
Las Vegas Locomotives players
People from Del City, Oklahoma
Players of American football from Oklahoma
Northeastern Oklahoma A&M Golden Norsemen football players